Below are select minor league players, and the rosters of the minor league affiliates, of the San Francisco Giants:

Players

Aeverson Arteaga

 Aeverson Javier Arteaga (born March 16, 2003) is a Venezuelan professional baseball shortstop in the San Francisco Giants organization.

Arteaga signed with the San Francisco Giants in July 2019. He did not play for a team in 2020 due to the Minor League Baseball season being cancelled because of the Covid-19 pandemic.

Arteaga made his professional debut in 2021 with the Arizona Complex League Giants in 2021 and played in one game with the San Jose Giants. He played 2022 with San Jose.

Jonathan Bermúdez

Jonathan Alberto Bermúdez (born October 16, 1995) is a Puerto Rican professional baseball pitcher in the San Francisco Giants organization.

Bermúdez was born in Coamo, Puerto Rico. He played college baseball at Saint Leo University and Southeastern University. In 2018 pitching for Southeastern he was 15–2 with a 1.95 ERA in 110.2 innings, and led the Sun Conference with 153 strikeouts. He was drafted by the Houston Astros in the 23rd round of the 2018 Major League Baseball Draft. The Astros added him to their 40-man roster after the 2021 season. He was designated for assignment on August 20, 2022.

On August 23, 2022, Bermúdez was claimed off waivers by the Giants. In 2022 with Sacramento he was 0–3 in five starts with a 9.22 ERA over 13.2 innings in which he gave up seven home runs and struck out 16 batters.

Mason Black

Mason Peter Black (born December 10, 1999 ) is an American professional baseball pitcher in the San Francisco Giants organization.

Black grew up in Archbald, Pennsylvania and attended Valley View High School. He finished his high school career with a 12–5 record and a 1.19 ERA with 123 strikeouts.

Black played college baseball for the Lehigh Mountain Hawks for three seasons. After his freshman season in 2019, he played collegiate summer baseball for the Brewster Whitecaps of the Cape Cod Baseball League and was named a league all-star. Black had a 1–2 record with a 3.68 ERA in four starts before the 2020 season was cut short due to the coronavirus pandemic. During the summer he pitched for the Boca Raton Blazers of the South Florida Collegiate Baseball League. Black was named the Patriot League Pitcher of the Year after he went 7–3 with a 3.11 ERA and 95 strikeouts in  innings pitched during his junior season.
 
Black was selected by the San Francisco Giants in the third round of the 2021 Major League Baseball Draft. He was assigned to the San Jose Giants of Low-A California League at the beginning of the 2022 season. Between San Jose and Class A+ Eugene, in 2022 he was 6–4 with a 3.21 ERA in 24 starts over 112 innings in which he struck out 136 batters.

Lehigh Mountain Hawks bio

Vaun Brown

Vaun Edward Brown (born June 23, 1998) is an American professional baseball outfielder in the San Francisco Giants organization.

Brown was born in Sarasota, Florida, to Herb and Kris Brown (a special education teacher), and has a sister, Kelly, a former high school basketball player. His father played two years of junior college football as a running back at Kutztown State College.

He attended Sarasota High School ('16) in Sarasota, Florida. Brown was 5' 7" and weighed 125 pounds as a freshman, and was cut from the baseball team, and in his high school career he did not hit a single home run.

Brown then played college baseball at Florida Southern College, studying business administration both for his bachelor's degree and for an MBA.  With the school's baseball team in 2020 he batted .286/.375/.571 with five home runs (6th in the conference) in 56 at bats.

In 2021 Brown hit .387/.462/.793 in 111 at bats, leading the league with 40 runs, 13 home runs, and 31 RBIs, while hitting 6 doubles (9th) with five hit by pitch (7th) and two sacrifice flies (6th), stealing nine bases (7th) in 11 attempts, and striking out 26 times (8th), as a fifth-year senior. He was named Sunshine State Conference Player of the Year, First Team All Conference, National Collegiate Baseball Writers Association (NCBWA) All South Region first team, American Baseball Coaches Association (ABCA) Rawlings All-South Region, 2020-21 College Sports Information Directors of America  (CoSIDA) Division II Academic All-America Second Team (with a 3.89 GPA while studying for his MBA at Florida Southern College), and ABCA NCAA Division II All-American Second Team. He then played for the Leesburg Lightning in the Florida Collegiate Summer League, and batted .346(3rd in the league)/.486(3rd)/.654(1st) in 26 at bats with five hit by pitch (6th) and 11 stolen bases (5th) in 12 attempts. In college he played 115 games in center field, 46 in right field, 19 in left field, and two at pitcher.

Brown was drafted by the San Francisco Giants in the 10th round of the 2021 Major League Baseball Draft.  When a scout asked him what signing bonus amount he was looking for, he laughed and said: "I’ll sign for a Pop Tart." He signed for a $7,500 signing bonus, over $100,000 less than the slot value for a 296th overall pick. He said: "It’s a gift to come out here and play every day.... I love this game."

Brown made his professional debut in 2021 with the Arizona Complex League Giants. He  batted .354(9th in the league)/.480(2nd)/.620(5th) in 79 at bats with 24 runs, four triples (4th), two home runs, 14 RBIs, eight steals in nine attempts, and 12 hit by pitch (leading the league). He played 20 games in center field, five in right field, and one in left field.

He started 2022 with the San Jose Giants before being promoted to the Eugene Emeralds. With San Jose, Brown led the league with a .636 slugging percentage and batted .347 (3rd in the league) with a .428 on-base percentage (9th), five triples (7th), and 23 steals in 26 attempts in 228 at bats. With Eugene, he led the league with a .350 batting average, .454 on-base percentage, and .612 slugging percentage in 157 at bats, was 9th with 11 hit by pitch, was 8th with four sacrifice flies, and had 21 steals in 24 attempts.

In 2022, Brown's .346 batting average and 1.060 on-base percentage plus slugging percentage (OPS) led all qualified hitters in the minor leagues, his .623 slugging percentage was the 3rd-highest in the minors, and his .437 on-base percentage was the 6th-highest.  Between San Jose, Eugene, and the AA Richmond Flying Squirrels he was .346/.437/.623 in 387 at bats with 100 runs, 7 triples, 23 home runs, 75 RBIs, 44 stolen bases in 50 attempts, and 19 hit by pitch. Only four other minor league players had passed 20 home runs, 20 stolen bases, a .300 average, .400 on-base percentage, and a .600 slugging percentage in a single season since 2006.  He played 43 games in left field, 28 in right field, 16 as a designated hitter, and 15 in center field. He was named an MiLB Organization All Star. Andrew Baggarly of The Athletic wrote: "He is as tooled up and athletic as any player the Giants have had in their system — not just this season, but in a generation. He burns up the basepaths. He has an above-average arm.... He handles high-velocity fastballs. He’ll turn around a first-pitch breaking ball. He can hit for power to all fields, and because of his speed, almost anything in play has the potential to be an extra-base hit. He isn’t just fast. He’s hungry fast. From the instant he takes off, he’s got the forward body lean of a sprinter stretching for the tape. He has been timed at 3.8 seconds home to first, which is exceptional for a left-handed hitter and elite for someone breaking out of the right-handed batter’s box, like Brown."

Seth Corry

Seth Corry (born November 3, 1998) is an American professional baseball pitcher in the San Francisco Giants organization.

Corry was born in Alpine, Utah. He attended Lone Peak High School in Highland, Utah. He played both baseball and football in high school, but stopped playing football after tearing his ACL during his junior year. He was drafted by the San Francisco Giants in the third round of the 2017 Major League Baseball draft. He signed, forgoing his commitment to play college baseball at Brigham Young University.

Corry made his professional debut in 2017 with the Arizona League Giants, going 0–2 with a 5.55 ERA over  innings. He played 2018 with the Arizona League Giants and Salem-Keizer Volcanoes, compiling a combined 4–3 record and 3.59 ERA over 14 total starts.

He spent 2019 with the Augusta GreenJackets and was named the South Atlantic League Pitcher of the Year after pitching to a 9–3 record with a 1.76 ERA over 27 games (26 starts), striking out 172 over  innings. He did not play a minor league game in 2020 due to the cancellation of the minor league season caused by the COVID-19 pandemic.

He returned to Eugene for the 2021 season, starting 19 games and going 3–3 with a 5.99 ERA, 100 strikeouts, and 63 walks over  innings. He opened the 2022 season back with Eugene, but was placed on the injured list after 2.1 innings in two starts, and subsequently underwent shoulder surgery, forcing him to miss the remainder of the season.

José Cruz

José Leonidas Cruz (born May 18, 2000) is a Dominican professional baseball pitcher in the San Francisco Giants organization.

Cruz was born in Santo Domingo, in the Dominican Republic. He was drafted by the Giants in 2017.

Pitching for the DSL Giants in 2018 he was 2–2 with five saves and a 4.88 ERA in 20 relief appearances. Pitching for the Giants Black in 2019 he was 2–3 with one save and a 4.50 ERA in 14 games (3 starts) in which he pitched 46 innings. Cruz did not play in a game in 2020 due to the cancellation of the minor league season because of the COVID-19 pandemic. In 2021 pitching for Giants Black he was 3–1 with five saves and a 4.44 ERA in 19 relief appearances, as in 24.1 innings he struck out 42 batters (15.5 strikeouts per 9 innings).

In 2022 with the Single-A San Jose Giants, he was 2–1 with 6 saves in 6 opportunities in 38 relief appearances, as in 52.1 innings he gave up 21 hits and struck out 86 batters (14.8 strikeouts per 9 innings). Post-season he was named a California League All Star, and named the “Best Relief Pitcher Prospect” in the California League by Baseball America.

Cruz was optioned to the Triple-A Sacramento River Cats to begin the 2023 season.

R.J. Dabovich

Roderick John Dabovich (born January 11, 1999) is an American professional baseball pitcher in the San Francisco Giants organization.

Dabovich was born in Pueblo, Colorado. He attended Pueblo West High School in Pueblo West, Colorado. He had a career 0.80 earned run average (ERA).

After graduating from high school, Dabovich enrolled at Central Arizona College where he played college baseball, posting a 9–3 record and 1.81 ERA over  innings as a freshman in 2018. After the year, he was selected by the Kansas City Royals in the 18th round of the 2018 Major League Baseball draft, but did not sign.  Instead, he transferred to Arizona State University. In 2019, his first year at Arizona State, he pitched 53 innings in which he went 7–1 with a 4.75 ERA and 47 strikeouts. After the 2019 season, he played collegiate summer baseball with the Chatham Anglers of the Cape Cod Baseball League. He entered the 2020 season expected to be the team's closer, but pitched only  innings with four saves before the season was cancelled due to the COVID-19 pandemic.

Dabovich was selected by the San Francisco Giants in the fourth round with the 114th overall selection of the 2020 Major League Baseball draft. He signed for $200,000. He did not play a minor league game in 2020 due to the cancellation of the season.

Dabovich began the 2021 season with the Eugene Emeralds of the High-A West and was promoted to the Richmond Flying Squirrels of the Double-A Northeast in mid-June. He missed a majority of August after going on the injured list with back tightness, and returned to play in early September. Over  innings pitched in relief between the two clubs, Dabovich went 1–1 with a 2.78 ERA and 62 strikeouts. He was selected to play in the Arizona Fall League for the Scottsdale Scorpions after the season where he went 1–0 and was named to the Fall Stars Game.

Dabovich returned to Richmond to begin the 2022 season. In late June, he was promoted to the Sacramento River Cats. Over 45 appearances (one start) between the two teams, he went 6–1 with a 3.51 ERA and 69 strikeouts over  innings.

Sam Delaplane

Samuel Louis Nathan Delaplane (born March 27, 1995) is an American professional baseball pitcher in the San Francisco Giants organization.

Delaplane is the son of Fred and Sue Delaplane, and has a brother, Brad. He attended Leigh High School ('13) in San Jose, California, which is where he was born. Playing baseball as a pitcher and catcher, he was All-League First Team and San Jose Mercury Honorable Mention in his senior season, as he was 6–2 with a 1.66 ERA on the mound and batted .342.

Undrafted out of high school, Delaplane attended Eastern Michigan University, earning a degree in marketing. He spent four seasons (2014–17) playing college baseball for the Eastern Michigan Eagles, and was first-team All-Mid-American Conference in his senior year. During the summer of 2016, he played for the Yarmouth–Dennis Red Sox of the Cape Cod League. He was named 2017 first team All-American (D-I) by the Jewish Sports Review.  Delaplane was drafted by the Seattle Mariners in the 23rd round of the 2017 MLB draft.

Delaplane split his debut season of 2017 between the AZL Mariners of the Rookie-level Arizona League and the Tacoma Rainiers of the Triple-A Pacific Coast League, combining to go 2–1 with a 3.00 ERA and 50 strikeouts over 33 innings (13.6 strikeouts per 9 innings). He spent the 2018 season with the Clinton LumberKings of the Class A Midwest League, going 4–2 with 10 saves (3rd in the league) and a 1.96 ERA, and 100 strikeouts over  innings (15.1 strikeouts per 9 innings; he struck out 38% of batters faced).

In 2019, he split the season between the Modesto Nuts of the Class A-Advanced California League and the Arkansas Travelers of the Double-A Texas League, going a combined 6–3 with 7 saves and a 2.23 ERA, and 120 strikeouts (leading all minor league relievers) over  innings (15.7 strikeouts per 9 innings; second-best in minor league baseball for pitchers who pitched 50 innings) in 46 relief appearances. Delaplane had the highest K-BB% (37.0%) and pure strikeout rate (45.8%) in minor league baseball, and his curveball/slider had the second-highest swing-and-miss rate of all slider in baseball.  He was named a mid-season California League All Star. In September 2019 Jim Callis named him to MLB Pipeline's Second Team Prospect Team of the Year.

Following the 2019 regular season, Delaplane played for the Peoria Javelinas of the Arizona Fall League, and in six appearances was 0–1 with two saves and a 1.13 ERA over eight innings with 15 strikeouts and 1 walk. He was named a Fall League All-Star. In April 2020 Fangraphs ranked him #11 on its list of Mariners' prospects. In July 2020 CBS Sports opined: "Sam Delaplane is one of, if not the best relief prospect in the game."

Delaplane did not play in a game in 2020 due to the cancellation of the minor league season because of the COVID-19 pandemic. On November 20, 2020, Delaplane was added to the 40-man roster. That month MLB Pipeline named him Seattle's #20 Prospect. In February 2021, Fangraphs ranked him #9. On April 13, 2021, Delaplane underwent Tommy John surgery, effectively ending his 2021 season. On May 27, 2021, Delaplane was designated for assignment by Seattle.

On May 31, 2021, Delaplane was acquired by the San Francisco Giants in exchange for cash considerations. He was placed on the 60-day injured list the next day as he continued to recover from Tommy John. Following the season, on November 30, 2021, Delaplane was non-tendered by the Giants and became a free agent. Delaplane re-signed with the Giants on December 1 on a minor league contract and was later invited to spring training.  He was added to the 40-man roster in June 2022; later in the month, after four rehab outings with the San Jose Giants in which he got out all 11 batters he retired by striking them out, he was put on the 60-day injured list with a right forearm strain. He resigned a minor league deal on November 28, 2022.

In four minor league seasons, Delaplane is 12–6 with 17 saves and has a 2.41 ERA, 1.09 WHIP, 15.3 K/9 (278 strikeouts in 164 innings), and a 4.63 SO/W ratio in 104 relief appearances.

Delaplane mixes up a 93–96 mph rising four-seam fastball, and an excellent 83–88 mph curveball-grip curveball/slider hybrid that has a high spin rate and late downward movement and which he releases straight over the top like his fastball.

Eastern Michigan Eagles bio

Matt Frisbee

Matthew D. Frisbee (born November 18, 1996) is an American professional baseball pitcher in the San Francisco Giants organization.

Frisbee was born and grew up in Candler, North Carolina, and attended Enka High School.

Frisbee played college baseball for the UNC Greensboro Spartans for three seasons. In 2017, he played collegiate summer baseball with the Harwich Mariners of the Cape Cod Baseball League. As a junior, he was named first team All-Southern Conference and the conference Pitcher of the Year after posting a record of 10–2 over 15 starts with a 3.45 ERA and 116 strikeouts in 91.1 innings pitched.
 
Frisbee was drafted by the San Francisco Giants in the 15th round of the 2018 Major League Baseball Draft. He was assigned to the Class A Short Season Salem-Keizer Volcanoes after signing with the team. Frisbee began the 2019 season with the Class A Augusta GreenJackets before he was promoted to the San Jose Giants of the Class A-Advanced California League, where he went 9–8 with a 3.17 ERA and was named the team's pitcher of the year.

Frisbee began the 2021 season with the AA Richmond Flying Squirrels, with whom he was 5–4 with a 3.77 ERA. He was promoted to the AAA Sacramento River Cats, with whom he was 1–6 with a 7.64 ERA. In 2022 with Richmond he was 6–10 with a 5.16 ERA in 27 games (26 starts) spanning 139.2 innings.

UNC Greensboro Spartans bio

Tyler Fitzgerald

Tyler Joseph Fitzgerald (born September 15, 1997) is an American professional baseball shortstop in the San Francisco Giants organization.

Fitzgerald was born in Springfield, Illinois, and attended Rochester High School in Rochester, Illinois. As a senior in 2016, he batted .500 with nine home runs, 31 RBIs, and 37 stolen bases. He was drafted by the Boston Red Sox in the 30th round of the 2016 Major League Baseball draft, but did not sign and instead enrolled at the University of Louisville to play college baseball.

Fitzgerald appeared in 48 games for Louisville as a freshman in 2017, slashing .208/.303/.272 over 125 at bats. As a sophomore, he batted .264/.344/.378 with three home runs, 24 RBIs, 23 stolen bases, and 17 doubles over 246 at bats over 64 games. In 2017 and 2018, Fitzgerald played collegiate summer baseball with the Bourne Braves of the Cape Cod Baseball League. As a junior in 2019, he hit .315/.391/.483 with eight home runs, 65 RBIs, 18 stolen bases, and seven sacrifice flies (second in the conference) in 267 at bats over 66 games. He was selected by the San Francisco Giants in the fourth round of the 2019 Major League Baseball draft. He signed for $497,500.

Fitzgerald spent his first professional season with the Arizona League Giants, Salem-Keizer Volcanoes, and Augusta GreenJackets, batting .276/.359/.395 with one home run, six stolen bases in seven attempts, and 30 RBIs over 48 games. He played the 2021 season with the Eugene Emeralds, slashing .262/.342/.495 with 19 home runs, 65 RBIs, and 28 doubles in 382 at-bats over 103 games. He was assigned to the Richmond Flying Squirrels for the 2022 season. Over 125 games, he slashed .229/.310/.424 with 21 home runs, 58 RBIs, and twenty stolen bases.

In 2022 with Richmond he batted .229/.310/.424 in 455 at bats, stealing 20 bases in 21 attempts. He played 87 games at shortstop, 30 at second base, eight at third base, and two at DH.

Fitzgerald's father, Mike, was drafted in the first round in the 1984 MLB draft by the St. Louis Cardinals and played 13 games in the majors.

Kyle Harrison

Kyle Christopher Harrison (born August 12, 2001) is an American professional baseball pitcher in the San Francisco Giants organization.

Harrison was born in San Jose, California, and attended De La Salle High School in Concord, California. As a junior in 2019 he was 10–0 with a 1.26 ERA for the Spartans, with 103 strikeouts in 61 innings. As a senior in 2020 he was 2–0 with an 0.78 ERA and pitched nine innings with 18 strikeouts before the season was ended due to Covid 19.  In his high school career, he was 21–1 with a 1.19 ERA in three years, striking out 192 batters in 124 innings.  He has a below three-quarter slot delivery.

He was drafted by the San Francisco Giants in the third round of the 2020 Major League Baseball draft and signed. He signed with the Giants for a signing bonus of $2.5 million rather than play college baseball at the University of California, Los Angeles (UCLA).

Harrison made his professional debut in 2021 with the Low-A San Jose Giants of the California League. Over 23 starts, he went 4–3 with a 3.19 ERA and 157 strikeouts (2nd in the league, and 14.3 strikeouts per nine innings, good for second in the league) over  innings. He led the league with 15 hit batters. He was named the 2021 CAL Pitcher of the Year, a CAL Post-Season All Star, and an MiLB.com Organization All Star.

He was ranked # 3 in the Giants 2022 MLB Prospect Rankings. In 2022 he was a Futures Game selection. He began the year at High-A Eugene, and in seven starts had 59 strikeouts in 29 innings and a 1.55 ERA. At Class AA Richmond, while almost five years younger than the average player in the league, as he turned 21 in August, he had a 2.96 ERA in 73 innings (15 starts) with 108 strikeouts. Baseball America selected him as the Giants' 2022 Minor League Player of the Year, and as the best pitching prospect in the Eastern League.

In his minor league career through 2022, he was 8–6 with a 2.93 ERA in 48 starts, as in 211.2 innings he struck out 343 batters (14.6 strikeouts per 9 innings).

He has a mid-90s fastball and a slider, and a developing changeup.

Luis Matos

Luis Eduardo Matos (born January 28, 2002) is a Venezuelan professional baseball outfielder in the San Francisco Giants organization.

Matos was born in Valera, Venezuela, and signed with the San Francisco Giants in July 2018 for a signing bonus of $725,000. He spent his first professional season in 2019 at 17 years of age with the Dominican Summer League Giants and Rookie-level Arizona League Giants, batting .367/.438/.566 with 65 runs, seven home runs, 48 RBIs, and 21 stolen bases over 60 games.

Matos did not play a minor league game in 2020 due to the cancellation of the minor league season caused by the COVID-19 pandemic. He played the 2021 season with the Low-A San Jose Giants. Over 109 games, he slashed .313/.358/.494 with 15 home runs, 86 RBIs, 35 doubles, and 21 stolen bases.

In 2022, playing for the Giants in the minor leagues, he batted .215/.280/.356 in 376 at bats with 58 runs, 12 home runs, and 47 RBIs. He played in the AFL, batted .233/.280/.361, and was named AFL Defensive Player of the Year. He was ranked # 2 in the Giants 2022 MLB Prospect Rankings.

Matos was optioned to the High-A Eugene Emeralds to begin the 2023 season.

Grant McCray

Grant Snow McCray (born December 7, 2000) is an American professional baseball outfielder in the San Francisco Giants organization.

McCray was born in Billings, Montana, and attended Lakewood Ranch High School in Bradenton, Florida. He was drafted by the San Francisco Giants in the third round of the 2019 Major League Baseball Draft.

McCray made his professional debut with the Arizona League Giants, batting .270/.379/.335 in 185 at bats.  He did not play for a team in 2020, due to the Minor League Baseball season being cancelled because of the Covid-19 pandemic. He returned in 2021 to play for the Arizona Complex League Giants and San Jose Giants, batting a combined .274/.342/.422 in 135 at bats.

McCray started 2022 with the San Jose Giants, with whom he batted .291/.383/.525(8th in the California League) in 436 at bats, with 92 runs (2nd), 9 triples (2nd), 21 home runs (3rd), 69 RBIs (10th), and 35 stolen bases (5th) while being caught 10 times (2nd), and 148 strikeouts (6th). He also had 52 at bats for Eugene, for whom he batted .269/.387/.423.

McCrays father, Rodney McCray, played in MLB.

Trevor McDonald

Trevor Dale McDonald (born February 26, 2001) is an American professional baseball pitcher in the San Francisco Giants organization.

McDonald attended George County High School in Lucedale, Mississippi. He was drafted by the San Francisco Giants in the 11th round of the 2019 Major League Baseball draft.

McDonald made his professional debut in 2019 with the Arizona League Giants. He did not pitch for a team in 2020 because the Minor League Baseball season was cancelled due to the Covid-19 pandemic. MCcDonald spent 2021 with the Arizona Complex League Giants and San Jose Giants. He started 2022 with San Jose before being promoted to the Eugene Emeralds.

Erik Miller

Erik Christopher Miller (born February 13, 1998) is an American professional baseball pitcher in the San Francisco Giants organization.

Miller attended De Smet Jesuit High School in Creve Coeur, Missouri. In 2015, his junior year, he went 5–1 with a 3.58 ERA, and as a senior in 2016, he compiled a 3–4 record and 3.14 ERA. He went undrafted in the 2016 Major League Baseball draft after emailing professional scouts that had contacted him and informing them that he would not sign if selected, and would be honoring his commitment to play college baseball at Stanford University.

In 2017, as a freshman at Stanford, Miller appeared in 17 games (making 13 starts and four relief appearances) in which he went 5–2 with a 3.65 ERA. After the season, he participated in the New England Collegiate Baseball League with the Newport Gulls. As a sophomore in 2018, he started 13 games, going 4–4 with a 4.07 ERA, striking out 52 over  innings. That summer, he played in the Cape Cod Baseball League with the Orleans Firebirds. During his junior season in 2019, Miller started 15 games and pitched to a 3.15 ERA and 97 strikeouts over 80 innings. Following the season, he was selected by the Philadelphia Phillies in the fourth round of the 2019 Major League Baseball draft.

Miller signed with the Phillies for $428,300, and made his professional debut in 2019 with the Rookie-level Gulf Coast League Phillies before earning promotions to the Williamsport Crosscutters of the Class A Short Season New York–Penn League and the Lakewood BlueClaws of the Class A South Atlantic League during the season. Over 11 games (seven starts) between the three clubs, he went 1–0 with a 1.50 ERA and 52 strikeouts (13.0 strikeouts per 9 innings) over 36 innings.

Miller was invited to spring training by the Phillies in 2021. He began the 2021 season on the injured list, and pitched only  innings for the year. He was selected to play in the Arizona Fall League for the Peoria Javelinas after the season.

He was assigned to the Reading Fightin Phils of the Double-A Eastern League to begin the 2022 season. He was selected to represent the Phillies at the 2022 All-Star Futures Game. In mid-August, he was promoted to the Lehigh Valley IronPigs of the Triple-A International League. Over 32 games (seven starts) between the two teams, he went 1–1 with a 3.54 ERA, 62 strikeouts (11.5 strikeouts per 9 innings), and 31 walks over  innings. He threw a fastball that could reach 98 mph, low-80s slider, and changeup.

On January 9, 2023, Miller was traded to the San Francisco Giants in exchange for Yunior Marte.

Ryan Murphy

Ryan Charles Murphy (born October 8, 1999) is an American professional baseball pitcher in the San Francisco Giants organization.

Murphy was born in Poughkeepsie, New York, and attended Roy C. Ketcham High School in Wappingers Falls, New York. He played college baseball at Le Moyne College, and was 16–9 with a 3.40  ERA over three seasons. He was drafted by the San Francisco Giants in the fifth round of the 2020 Major League Baseball draft.

Murphy made his professional debut in 2021 with the San Jose Giants before being promoted to the Eugene Emeralds. Over 21 starts between the two clubs, Murphy went 6–4 with a 2.52 ERA and 164 strikeouts over  innings.

In 2022, he pitched for Giants Black, San Jose, Eugene, and Richmond. He was a combined 2–1 with a 4.63 ERA in 11 games (9 starts) in which he pitched 42.1 innings and struck out 57 batters.

Tristan Peters

Tristan Dimitri Peters (born February 29, 2000) is a Canadian professional baseball outfielder in the San Francisco Giants organization.

Peters was born in Winkler, Manitoba, Canada, and played college baseball at Chandler-Gilbert Community College and Southern Illinois University. He was drafted by the Milwaukee Brewers in the seventh round of the 2021 Major League Baseball Draft.

Peters made his professional debut with the Arizona Complex League Brewers and started 2022 with the Wisconsin Timber Rattlers, for whom he batted .306/.386/.485 in 330 at bats with eight triples and seven home runs. On August 2, 2022, the Brewers traded Peters to the San Francisco Giants for pitcher Trevor Rosenthal. Playing for AA Richmond, he batted .212/.302/.303 in 132 at bats.

Jairo Pomares

Jairo Jeffry Pomares (born August 4, 2000) is a Cuban professional baseball outfielder in the San Francisco Giants organization.

Pomares was born in Sancti Spíritus, Cuba, and signed with the San Francisco Giants as an international free agent in 2018 for $975,500. He made his professional debut in 2019 with the Rookie-level Arizona League Giants and was promoted to the Salem-Keizer Volcanoes of the Class A Short Season Northwest League during the season. Over 51 games between both teams, he slashed .324/.362/.465 with three home runs and 37 RBIs in 213 at bats, playing primarily in right field. He did not play a minor league game in 2020 due to the cancellation of the season.

Pomares missed the first six weeks of the 2021 season while recovering from back surgery, but eventually began play with the San Jose Giants of the Low-A West in June, playing primarily in right field. His .694 slugging percentage led the Low-A West. He was promoted to the Eugene Emeralds of the High-A West in August, playing in left field. Over 77 games with the two clubs, Pomares compiled a slash line of .334/.378/.629 with 20 home runs, 59 RBIs, and 27 doubles over 302 at bats.

He returned to Eugene for the 2022 season. Over 95 games with Eugene, he slashed .254/.330/.438 with 14 home runs and 59 RBIs, while playing primarily left field. Playing for Giants Orange, he was 8-for-15, with three doubles and three home runs.

Randy Rodríguez

Randy Alberto Rodríguez (born September 5, 1999) is a Dominican professional baseball pitcher in the San Francisco Giants organization.

Rodríguez was born in Santo Domingo, Dominican Republic, and signed with the San Francisco Giants as an international free agent in July 2017.

In 2021 for San Jose he was 6–3 with five holds, two saves, and a 1.74 ERA in 32 relief appearances, in which he pitched 62 innings and had 101 strikeouts (14.7 strikeouts per 9 innings). He held right-handed batters to a slash line of .158/.233/.188.  He was named a CAL post-season All Star.  The Giants added him to their 40-man roster after the 2021 season.

In 2022 for Class A+ Eugene, AA Richmond, and AAA Sacramento he was a combined 2–5 with a 4.46 ERA in 27 games (13 starts) in which he pitched 66.2 innings and struck out 97 batters (13.1 strikeouts per 9 innings). He held right-handed batters to a slash line of .114/.253/.220.

Landen Roupp

Landen Brice Roupp (born September 10, 1998) is an American professional baseball pitcher in the San Francisco Giants organization.

Roupp was born in Rocky Mount, North Carolina, and attended Faith Christian School in Rocky Mount, and played four seasons of college baseball at the University of North Carolina Wilmington (UNCW). In 2019, he played collegiate summer baseball with the Wareham Gatemen of the Cape Cod Baseball League. As a redshirt junior at UNCW in 2021, he started 15 games and went 8–5 with a 2.58 ERA and 118 strikeouts over 101 innings and was named the Colonial Athletic Association Pitcher of the Year. After the season, he was selected by the San Francisco Giants in the 12th round of the 2021 Major League Baseball draft.

Roupp signed with the Giants and made his professional debut with the Arizona Complex League Giants and was promoted to the San Jose Giants at the season's end. He pitched a total of eight innings between both teams.

He opened the 2022 season with San Jose as a reliever before moving into the starting rotation and was promoted to the Eugene Emeralds and Richmond Flying Squirrels during the season. Over 26 games (14 starts) between the three teams, Roupp went 10–3 with a 2.60 ERA and 152 strikeouts over  innings.

UNC Wilmington Seahawks bio

Patrick Ruotolo

Patrick Anthony Ruotolo (born January 16, 1995) is an American professional baseball pitcher in the San Francisco Giants organization.

Ruotolo was born in Beverly, Massachusetts, He attended Peabody Veterans Memorial High School in Massachusetts, where he was a four-year NEC All-Starand in his junior year had an 0.28 ERA, 130 strikeouts, and a 9–1 record.

He played college baseball for the UConn Huskies for three seasons. After his freshman and sophomore seasons, Ruotolo played collegiate summer baseball with the Brewster Whitecaps of the Cape Cod Baseball League. In 2016 Ruotolo was named second team All-American Athletic Conference after saving 12 games with a 2.25 ERA.
 
Ruotolo was drafted by the San Francisco Giants in the 27th round of the 2016 Major League Baseball Draft. Ruotolo spent the 2017 season with the Augusta GreenJackets and made 44 appearances and posted a 4–2 record and had 17 saves out of 18 opportunities with a 1.68 ERA, and in 48.1 innings struck out 69 batters. He was assigned to the Class A-Advanced San Jose Giants at the start of 2018 and had a 1.47 ERA over 14 appearances before being promoted to the Double-A Richmond Flying Squirrels. Later in the season Ruotolo tore the ulnar collateral ligament in his pitching elbow, requiring him to undergo Tommy John surgery.

He returned late in the 2019 season and pitched for the Arizona League Giants before being promoted to San Jose. Between the two teams, Ruotolo was 1–0 with three saves and an 0.95 ERA, as in 19 innings he struck out 24 batters. After not playing in 2020 due to the cancellation of the minor league season caused by the COVID-19 pandemic, Ruotolo returned to Richmond in 2021 and went 3–1 with 11 saves and a 2.68 ERA in 37 innings in which he struck out 50 batters over 39 appearances.

In 2022, pitching primarily for Sacramento, Ruotolo was 2–4 with three saves and a 6.49 ERA over 34.2 innings in which he struck out 49 batters in 29 relief appearances.

UConn Huskies bio

Blake Sabol

Blake Joseph Sabol (born January 7, 1998) is an American professional baseball catcher and outfielder for the San Francisco Giants of Major League Baseball (MLB).

Sabol was born in Aliso Viejo, California. Sabol's brother, Stefan, played college baseball at the University of Oregon and in the New York Mets organization.

He attended Aliso Niguel High School in Aliso Viejo.  In high school he batted .338/.418/.498 with 11 home runs, 73 RBIs, and 43 stolen bases in 126 games. He was named 2013 and 2014 All-Sea View League, and 2016 South Coast All-League. In 2013 he won a gold medal with the Team USA U15 National Team at the Pan Am Games, in 2015 Perfect Game USA rated him the No. 64 player in the nation in his class and seventh-best catcher, and Perfect Game named him a 2015 First Team Underclass All-American, and in 2016 Max Preps rated him the 23rd-best player in the nation for his class.

He was selected by the Cleveland Indians in the 33rd round of the 2016 Major League Baseball draft, but did not sign and instead enrolled at the University of Southern California to play college baseball. In 2017, he played collegiate summer baseball with the Wareham Gatemen of the Cape Cod Baseball League, and returned to the league in 2018 with the Chatham Anglers where he was named a league all-star after batting .340/.445/.573 in 103 at bats with seven home runs. As a junior in 2019, he played in 55 games and batted .268/.346/.368 in 231 at bats with 37 runs, three home runs, and 22 RBIs. In college on defense he played 70 games in left field, 55 games at catcher, and 12 in center field. After the season, he was selected by the Pittsburgh Pirates in the seventh round of the 2019 Major League Baseball draft.

Sabol signed with the Pirates for a signing bonus of $247,500, and made his professional debut with the Class A- West Virginia Black Bears with whom he hit .245/.350/.351 in 208 at bats with two home runs and 22 RBIs over 57 games. On defense, he played 20 games in right field, 13 in left field, and 8 in center field.

He split the 2021 season between the Class A Bradenton Marauders and the Class A+ Greensboro Grasshoppers, slashing .310/.406/.551 in 245 at bats with 13 home runs and 45 RBIs over 66 games.  Between the two teams, he played 28 games at catcher, 12 in left field, and two in right field.

He opened the 2022 season with the AA Altoona Curve, and was promoted to the AAA Indianapolis Indians in late August. Over 123 games between the two teams, he slashed .284/.363/.497 in 447 at bats with 74 runs, 26 doubles, 19 home runs, and 75 RBIs. He was 5th in the Eastern League with five triples. Between the two teams, he played 66 games at catcher, 34 at DH, and 21 in left field. He played in the Arizona Fall League for the Surprise Saguaros after the season.

On December 7, 2022, Sabol was selected by the Cincinnati Reds with the fourth overall pick in the Major League phase of the 2022 Rule 5 draft. He was then traded to the San Francisco Giants for cash considerations and a player to be named later. The Giants will not be able to send him to the minor leagues in 2023 without offering him back to the Pirates.

Casey Schmitt

Casey Shawn Schmitt (born March 1, 1999) is an American baseball third baseman in the San Francisco Giants organization.

Schmitt was born and grew up in San Diego, California, and attended Eastlake High School.

Schmitt played college baseball at San Diego State for three seasons as both a pitcher and a third baseman. As a freshman, he set a school record with an 0.28 ERA and had nine saves and 24 strikeouts in 32 innings pitched. He was named second team All-Mountain West Conference as a sophomore after batting .315 with five home runs and 36 RBIs and post a 3–3 record with a 3.77 ERA, eight saves and 44 strikeouts in 43 innings pitched. After the 2019 season, Schmitt played collegiate summer baseball for the Cotuit Kettleers of the Cape Cod Baseball League, where he was named a league all-star and the league's playoff MVP. As a junior in 2020, Schmitt batted .323/.386/.452 with four doubles and two triples in 16 games before the season was cut short due to the coronavirus pandemic.

Schmitt was selected in the second round of the 2020 Major League Baseball draft by the San Francisco Giants. The Giants drafted him with the intention of him focusing solely on playing third base. Schmitt was assigned to the San Jose Giants of Low-A West for the 2021 season and batted .247/.318/.406	in 251 at bats, with 36 runs, eight home runs, and 29 RBIs before suffering a season-ending injury in August.

In 2022, playing for Eugene, Richmond, and Sacramento, he batted .293/.365/.489 in 468 at bats with 21 home runs and 78 RBIs. He primarily played third base, while also playing 40 games at shortstop. He was named an NWL post-season All Star, and an MiLB PCL Gold Glove. He was also named the 2022 MiLB Gold Glove as the best defensive third baseman in the minor leagues.

San Diego State Aztecs bio

Drew Strotman

Andrew Gregory Strotman (born September 3, 1996) is an American professional baseball pitcher in the San Francisco Giants organization.

Strotman attended Homestead High School in Cupertino, California. In 2014, his senior year, he went 6–3 with a 0.54 ERA. He was not drafted out of high school, and enrolled at Saint Mary's College of California, where he played college baseball.

In 2015, Strotman's freshman year at Saint Mary's, he pitched  innings, going 2–3 with an 8.57 ERA. As a sophomore in 2016, he pitched in 22 games (making three starts), compiling a 3–5 record with a 3.96 ERA. In 2017, his junior season, Strotman pitched to a 6–1 record and a 4.57 ERA over 18 games (seven starts), striking out 75 batters over 67 innings. He was selected by the Tampa Bay Rays in the fourth round of the 2017 Major League Baseball draft.

Strotman signed with the Rays and made his professional debut with the Hudson Valley Renegades of the Class A Short Season New York-Penn League, going 2–3 with a 1.78 ERA over 11 games (seven starts). He was named an All-Star. In 2018, he pitched with the Bowling Green Hot Rods of the Class A Midwest League where he went 3–0 with a 3.52 ERA over 46 innings. He missed the last three months of the season after undergoing Tommy John surgery.

He returned to the mound in 2019 with the Charlotte Stone Crabs of the Class A-Advanced Florida State League, pitching to an 0–2 record and a 5.06 ERA over 16 innings. He did not play a minor league game in 2020 since the season was cancelled due to the COVID-19 pandemic. On November 20, 2020, Strotman was added to the 40-man roster. To begin the 2021 season, he was assigned to the Durham Bulls of the Triple-A East. Over 13 games (12 starts) with Durham, he posted a 7–2 record and a 3.39 ERA.

On July 22, 2021, Strotman was traded alongside Joe Ryan to the Minnesota Twins in exchange for Nelson Cruz and Calvin Faucher. He was assigned to the St. Paul Saints of the Triple-A East. Over 12 starts with St. Paul, Strotman went 3–3 with a 7.33 ERA and 42 strikeouts over 54 innings.

Pitching for St. Paul in 2022, he was 3–2 with a 6.44 ERA in 39 relief appearances, in which he pitched 50.1 innings and struck out 58 batters. On September 17, 2022, the Twins designated Strotman for assignment.

On September 19, Strotman was claimed off waivers by the Texas Rangers. Pitching for their AAA affiliate at Round Rock in 2022, he was 1–0 in three relief appearances in which he pitched 2.1 innings, giving up one earned run.

On November 10, 2022, the San Francisco Giants claimed Strotman off waivers from the Texas Rangers. He was non-tendered then re-signed to a minor league deal a couple days later.

Keaton Winn

Keaton Winn (born February 20, 1998) is an American professional baseball pitcher in the San Francisco Giants organization.

Winn was born in Ollie, Iowa, a town of 150 people. In Pekin High School he was an All-State wide receiver in football, an all-conference basketball player, and a 4X200 state champion in track. He attended Iowa Western Community College, for whom over two years he was 9–2 with five saves and a 2.37 ERA in 31 games (7 starts) in which he pitched 87.1 innings with 115 strikeouts. He was drafted by the Giants in fifth round of the 2018 draft, and signed for a $500,000 signing bonus.

In 2018, pitching for Low-A Salem Keizer, he was 3–1 with a 4.81 ERA in 15 games (5 starts) in which he pitched 43 innings. In 2019, pitching for Class A Augusta, he was 7–7 with a 3.32 ERA in 26 games (20 starts) in which he pitched 127.1 innings and allowed only 26 walks (1.8 walks per 9 innings). He did not play in 2020 or 2021. Winn had Tommy John surgery prior to the 2021 season. 

In 2022 he played for the Single-A San Jose Giants, the High-A Eugene Emeralds, and the Double-A Richmond Flying Squirrels, and was a combined 6–6 with a 4.08 ERA in 27 games (25 starts) in which he pitched 108 innings and struck out 125 batters.

Winn was optioned to the Triple-A Sacramento River Cats to begin the 2023 season.

Brett Wisely 

Brett Michael Wisely (born May 8, 1999) is an American professional baseball second baseman in the San Francisco Giants organization.

Wisely attended Sandalwood High School in Jacksonville, Florida, and played on their baseball team. As a senior in 2017, he batted .514 with six home runs as a leadoff hitter, alongside leading the area with 11 wins and 1.25 ERA while striking out 88 batters over 67 innings. He was named the Times-Unions All-First Coast baseball player of the year.

Wisely then played two years of college baseball at Gulf Coast State College. In 2019, he hit .361 with ten home runs and 50 RBIs over 48 games. Following the season's end, he was selected by the Tampa Bay Rays in the 15th round with the 458th overall pick in the 2019 Major League Baseball draft.

Wisely signed with the Rays for a signing bonus of $125,000, and made his professional debut with the Princeton Rays, with whom he batted .274/.335/.441 in 179 at bats with 30 runs, five home runs, and 25 RBIs over 47 games. He did not play a minor league game in 2020 due to the cancellation of the season caused by the COVID-19 pandemic.

He opened the 2021 season with the Charleston RiverDogs, before being promoted to the Bowling Green Hot Rods. Over 100 games between both clubs, Wisely hit .301/.376/.503 in 386 at bats with 78 runs, 19 home runs, 74 RBIs, and 31 stolen bases in 39 attempts. He was named an MiLB.com Organization All Star.

He was assigned to the Montgomery Biscuits to start the 2022 season, and was promoted to the Durham Bulls near the season's end. In 2022 over 117 games between the two teams, he slashed .273/.366/.455 with 15 home runs, 58 RBIs, and 32 stolen bases while being caught 11 times. His 84 runs led the Southern League, his 23 doubles and his 62 walks were both tenth, his six triples were second, and his 31 steals were eighth in the league. He was named a Southern League post-season All Star. Between the two teams, in 2022 he played 56 games at second base, 19 at shortstop, and 15 at third base.

On November 15, 2022, Wisely was traded to the San Francisco Giants in exchange for minor league outfielder Tristan Peters. The Giants subsequently added him to their 40-man roster.

Jake WongJacob Ryne Wong' (born September 3, 1996) is an American professional baseball pitcher in the San Francisco Giants organization.

Wong attended Hamilton High School in Chandler, Arizona. In 2015, his senior year, he pitched to a 2.86 ERA. Undrafted in the 2015 Major League Baseball draft, he enrolled at Grand Canyon University where he played college baseball.

In 2016, Wong's freshman season at Grand Canyon, he appeared in 18 games (making six starts) in which he went 2–3 with a 4.28 ERA. That summer, he played in the West Coast League for the Corvallis Knights. As a sophomore in 2017, he moved into the starting rotation and was GCU's Friday night starter, going 5–3 with a 4.00 ERA over 14 starts. After the season, he played in the Cape Cod Baseball League with the Orleans Firebirds, pitching to a 2.58 ERA over  innings. In 2018, Wong's junior year, he started 15 games and pitched to a 9–3 record and a 2.81 ERA, striking out 88 batters over  innings. After the season, he was selected by the San Francisco Giants in the third round of the 2018 Major League Baseball draft.

Wong signed with the Giants and made his professional debut with the Salem-Keizer Volcanoes, compiling a 2.30 ERA over 11 starts. In 2019, he began the year with the Augusta GreenJackets with whom he went 2–1 with a 1.99 ERA over eight starts being promoted to the San Jose Giants in May. Over 15 starts with San Jose, he pitched to a 3–2 record with a 4.98 ERA, striking out 67 over  innings.

Wong did not play a minor league game in 2020 due to the cancellation of the minor league season caused by the COVID-19 pandemic. He missed the whole 2021 season after undergoing surgery.

He was assigned to the Eugene Emeralds of the High-A Northwest League for the 2022 season. Over 25 games (17 starts), he went 6–5 with one save (his first in the minors) and a 4.52 ERA and 108 strikeouts over  innings.

Full Triple-A to Rookie League rosters

Triple-A

Double-A

High-A

Single-A

Rookie

References

Minor league players
Lists of minor league baseball players